Bradford station is an MBTA Commuter Rail station in Bradford, Massachusetts. It serves the Haverhill Line. The Haverhill Line's layover yard is located adjacent to the station.

History 

The Boston and Portland Railroad opened to Bradford, across the Merrimack River from Haverhill, on October 26, 1837. It was the terminus of the line until the January 1, 1840 extension across the river and into New Hampshire. The Boston and Portland became the Boston and Maine Railroad (B&M) in 1843.

The Newburyport Railroad opened its Haverhill Branch between Georgetown and Bradford on September 22, 1851, with regular service beginning the next month. The B&M obtained control of the Newburyport in 1855 and leased it in 1860. The B&M built a new depot building in the 1870s, likely as part of a double-tracking project. It was raised  in 1904–05 as part of a grade crossing elimination project.

Passenger service on the Haverhill Branch ended in 1933, though a short segment to a paper mill remained in freight use until 1982. The B&M sold the depot for commercial reuse in the 1960s, though service to Bradford continued until the last remaining Haverhill round trip was canceled in April 1976. MBTA Commuter Rail service resumed on December 17, 1979.

Prior to 1987, when the system was operated by B&M successor Guilford Transportation Industries, trains were stored overnight on Guilford-owned sidings north of Haverhill station in a largely industrial area. When the MBTA contracted with Amtrak in 1987 to operate the system, a new layover yard for the line was needed. The MBTA constructed a two-track layover yard adjacent to a rebuilt Bradford station at a cost of $2.2 million. It was built without an environmental evaluation process in violation of state law; not until 1992 did complaints from residents prompt the MBTA to belatedly start the process. Because of its proximity to the Bradford residential neighborhood, the noise and diesel fumes from the layover have prompted continued complaint from residents.  Mini-high platforms for accessibility were added to the station around 1992.

, the MBTA plans to relocate and expand the layover facility in the mid-to-late 2020s.

References

External links 

MBTA – Bradford

Stations along Boston and Maine Railroad lines
MBTA Commuter Rail stations in Essex County, Massachusetts
Railway stations in the United States opened in 1979
1979 establishments in Massachusetts